The 2011 Pacific Games (officially known as NC 2011) took place in Nouméa, New Caledonia, from August 27 to September 10, 2011. Nouméa was the 14th host of the Pacific Games. Upon closure of the registration for entries, "some 4,300 athletes" had registered from the twenty-two competing nations, although it was expected that not all would attend.

Competing nations
There were 22 nations from the Pacific competing in Nouméa. The numbers provided in brackets indicate the number of registered athletes prior to the Games, with that number expected to diminish by the Games' start. Clicking on the number will take you to a page on that nation's delegation to the 2011 Games.

Mascot

The mascot for 2011, Joemy, was unveiled on 27 August 2009 after a public vote by mail, email, fax and SMS (with nearly 8,000 voters). An initial sketch by a pupil from Jules Garnier High School in Nouméa was transformed into a three dimensional cartoon character by graphic designers at Banana Studio in Nouméa.

Joemy is a blue flying fox in orange shorts. Her name was intended as an "invitation", chosen for its proximity to the local Drehu word  (pronounced "chôémi" which means "come") and the English phrase "join me". The flying fox is an animal that is endemic to New Caledonia. The colour blue was chosen as representing the ocean surrounding all of the 22 island countries taking part in the Games.

Sporting events
There were 27 sports contested at the 2011 Games:

A list of 30 sports was proposed in August 2009, with a maximum of 28 to be included. There were 12 compulsory sports, with 10 having to be staged for both men and women
(athletics,
basketball,
beach volleyball,
golf,
swimming,
table tennis,
tennis,
va’a outrigger canoeing,
volleyball,
weightlifting), and a further 2 having to be staged for men (football and rugby sevens) that were optional women's events.

The remaining (up to) 16 sports were to be selected from: archery, badminton, baseball, bodybuilding, boxing, cricket, cycling, team handball, judo, karate, power lifting, sailing, shooting, squash, surfing, taekwondo, and triathlon.

Notes:Athletics: For the first time at the Pacific Games, four parasport events were included: Men's Shot Put – seated throw, Women's Shot Put – seated throw, Men's Javelin – ambulatory, and Men's 100m – ambulatory.
 Cricket -  all matches were deemed by the International Cricket Council as "Official Internationals" meaning that participating countries had the opportunity to move up into a higher ICC membership category 
 Football - the men's event was supposed to be the first stage qualification for the FIFA 2014 World Cup in Brazil and the women's event was supposed to be the first stage qualification for the 2012 Summer Olympics in London. However, in June 2011 the format was amended, and the Pacific Games were no longer part of the qualification process.
 Tennis - the Oceania Tennis Federation used the Pacific Games as an official selection event for the Pacific Oceania Davis Cup (Men) and Federation Cup (Women) teams

Medal table
The host nation topped the medal count.

Key
 Host nation (New Caledonia)

Schedule

References

Sources

External links
 Official website: 

 
Pacific Games by year
Pacific Games
Pacific Games
Pacific Games
21st century in Nouméa
International sports competitions hosted by New Caledonia
Sports competitions in Nouméa
August 2011 sports events in Oceania
September 2011 sports events in Oceania